Southcoates is an urban area in the eastern part of Kingston upon Hull, England.

A named habitation at Southcoates dates to at least the 11th century, during the medieval period the place was a small hamlet, associated with Drypool. The urban growth of Hull expanded over Southcoates in the late 19th and early 20th century, and the place subsequently gave its name to council wards.

The area of Southcoates centred on the former village is predominantly urban housing. The southern part of the Southcoates area is adjacent to the Humber Estuary, and was originally wetlands; a large amount of land was reclaimed southwards on the foreshore during the construction of the Alexandra Dock in the 1880s; this land and adjacent areas are in predominantly industrial and dock use.

Geography

Southcoates is an urban area of Kingston upon Hull. The north-west boundary is roughly formed by the A165 Holderness Road beyond which is the urban area of Summergangs and the public park East Park. The eastern boundary approximates with the Holderness Drain beyond which is Marfleet to the south-east, and the Preston Road area. To the south-west is the Drypool area, and to the south is Alexandra Dock and the associated industrial area along the A63 Hedon Road, which includes Hull Prison and Hedon Road Cemetery.

In the modern era (2012), Southcoates give its name to two Hull City Council wards: Southcoates West, and Southcoates East. Formerly (1998) a single area "Southcoates (ward)" was used by the Office for National Statistics, for statistical purposes.
Following a review, in 2017, by the Local Government Boundary Commission the number of councillors in Kingston upon Hull was reduced to 57 from 21 wards, effective from the 2018 elections, and restored a single Southcoates ward.

History

1066–1700
Southcoates, in mentioned in the 11th-century Domesday Book as Sotecote, both in association with Drypool, According to A.H. Smith the name Southcoates may derive from an old Norse name Soti and cote (cottage), meaning "Soti's Cottage".

The manor of Southcoates, which included land at Drypool was held by the Suttons during the 13th and 14th centuries until Thomas de Sutton (d.1389), after which it passed to a succession of heirs; in 1415 the manor was split in three. Ownership of the manor became increasing fragmented through the remainder of the medieval period, and up to enclosure in the mid 1700s.

There was a chapel at Southcoates, with right of chantry established in around 1236.

At the time of the Domesday survey the land at Southcoates was described as 'waste'. In the medieval period Southcoates was farmed on the open field system, with three fields (East, West and Humber field), plus additional wetlands south of the village known as the South Ings (see Ings), additionally there was some land reclaimed from the Humber, known as the Growths (or Groves). The fields were used for arable farming, and later for pasture.

In the early 14th century a road from Drypool (north-east) to Bilton Bridge via Summergangs was improved, and connected to 'Sutkotes' via a junction at a wayside cross.

1700–1860
Adult population in Southcoates was in the low tens during the late medieval period to the 1700s. The fields at Southcoates were enclosed in 1764.

By 1801 population had reached 201, in  the population of the township was 1,114 in 226 houses, (Samuel Lewis give a figure of 798) which rose to 1673 in 1851. By the 1850s Drypool had become urbanised, and development was spreading along the Holderness Road; however Southcoates was still a small hamlet in an essentially rural environment.

After 1847 the Sutton, Southcoates, and Drypool Gas Company began to supply the area with gas from a works. In 1853 the Victoria Dock Branch Line opened with a circular route from Paragon station to Victoria Dock – Southcoates railway station was built on the line, but was over a mile south-west of the hamlet; the Hull and Holderness Railway which connected to the Victoria Dock branch, opened 1854, and ran approximately half a mile south of Southcoates, roughly parallel to the Humber towards Marfleet and Hedon.

A small cemetery "Drypool and Southcoates Cemetery" was opened in the 1850s for the parish of Drypool. The sacristy of the cemetery was used for religious services from 1877 (St Nathaniel, after 1885 as St Bartholomew), and later (1891) replaced with a tin tabernacle type church (demolished 1929).

In a will and codicils of 1713 and 1717 Eleanor Scott had left  of land to be used charitably or the poor of Southcoates. A school and school house were built 1855/6 funded by the charity.

1860–1945

In 1865 construction began of a new prison on Hedon Road on a  site, replacing an earlier one at Kingston Street. In 1873 the Hull General Cemetery Company acquired  of land on Hedon Road for the purposes of a cemetery (Hedon Road Cemetery); This was expanded by  further  in 1894, and a crematorium built. The cemetery was full by 1960, and the crematorium disused . In the 1880s the Alexandra Dock was built to the south of the village on the foreshore of the Humber Estuary, extending into the Humber by reclaiming land. Also in the 1880s the Drypool and Marfleet Steam Tramways Company constructed a tramway along Hedon Road, with their main depot at Hotham Street. The tramway was later acquired by Hull Corporation Trams and converted to electric power running in 1903.

By the 1880s "South Ings"; the area south of the Hull and Holderness railway line, and north of the new dock was beginning to be developed; Lee Smith Street was already in existence in 1850, and by 1880 had been built upon (initially named "New Town"), including a Wesleyan chapel (1866, from 1910 Lutheran), a Primitive Methodist chapel (1877, replaced 1894), the Cemetery, Prison and Sanatorium had also been established. Additionally housing around Crowle Street had been developed. The City Hospital or City Sanitorium (infectious diseases) was built  on Hedon Road, near the Holderness drain.

A new depot for electric trams had been established on Hedon Road by 1903. By 1910 the most of the land between the railway line and Hedon Road was built upon, land development was practically complete by the 1930s with the construction of the three storey flat development at  Newtown Square. An additional railway line running roughly parallel to the Withernsea Line was built  for access to the new King George Dock, and the Withernsea Line track layout modified. The crossing of Southcoates Lane and the railway lines to was converted into a road flyover by the 1920s.

The urban growth of Hull continued in the late 19th and 20th century; in 1897 the area of Southcoates became a ward of the expanding Kingston upon Hull. Crowle Street School was first established in 1884 (796 places) and expanded to over 1,000 places in 1897. Estcourt Street School was established in 1902 with another 1,000 places.

By 1910 building development along Holderness Road extended beyond Southcoates, and expansion from Drypool was approaching the village from the south-west; by the 1930s housing development had reached the village, with building along to roads connecting the former hamlet to Holderness Road (South Coates Lane and Avenue), additionally a new housing estate was being development adjacent to the east and a canister works had been established to the south-east of the former village centre. By the late 1930s housing development extended beyond the former village north-eastwards, with only a few areas undeveloped, and a second large container factory had been established by the end of the first half of the 20th century.

New schools were established in the area during the growth on population: Southcoates Lane School opened 1912 with places for 700 boys and girls, plus 640 juniors and infants; and Sacred Heart (Roman Catholic) Junior and Infant School opened 1932 (300 places). A fire station was built on Southcoates Lane .

Other secular, charitable and religious establishments in the first half of the 20th century included:  Four almshouses built  funded by Eleanor Scott's Charity, with a further three houses were built in the 1930s. A temporary church (Rosmead Street)  opened in 1919, but burnt down in 1923; and a permanent replacement 'St John the Evangelist'  built 1925, damaged during the Hull Blitz (1941) and reopened in after repairs (1952). The  Catholic 'Church of the Sacred Heart' was established on Southcoates Lane in 1929, and the Sisters of Mercy Catholic religious order moved to a new convent on Southcoates Lane, built in 1931.

The 'City Hospital' moved to Cottingham in 1929 (see Castle Hill Hospital), and the old Hedon Road hospital was repurposed as a maternity hospital. A cinema, the 'Royalty', was built on Southcoates Lane in 1935.

The area was heavily bombed during the Hull Blitz, in part due to the docks and dockside industries being a primary target for Luftwaffe bombing raids. At Rustenberg Street bombing caused what are thought to be the first deaths in  Hull in August 1940. Alexandra Dock was targeted on 15/16 April with bombs also falling on Hotham Street causing deaths. The Rustenberg Street area was hit by bombs again on 18 July 1941 resulting in several deaths. A raid on 1 August 1942 targeted Alexandra Dock, resulting in deaths in the surrounding area including Southcoates; an 1800 kg bomb fell on Grindell Street killing 23. A raid on 14 July 1943 targeted the railway system – both Southcoates Lane bridge and nearby signal box were hit, Both Estcourt Street School, and the Methodist Chapel (Hedon Road) were destroyed during the bombing. The Prison was also badly damaged by bombing.

Modern (1945–present)

Excluding some minor infill housing developments in the late 1940s the pattern and scope of housing development in Southcoates remained essentially unchanged in the second half of the 20th century. Estcourt Street Infant School, and Alderman Cogan High School, were opened in 1954 and 1957 respectively. In 1955 St Aidan's church was consecrated. In 1957 a new chapel for the Primitive Methodists was built in Southcoates Lane, to replace the Hedon Road chapel which had been destroyed by bombing in 1941. In 1960 the site of the former Drypool and Southcoates cemetery and chapel was converted into a public garden. A new secondary school 'David Lister', began construction in 1963.

In 1976 a serious three-day riot took place at Hull Prison.

Southcoates Lane School was given listed building status in 1994. Crowle Street School was demolished 1996. Hedon Road maternity hospital closed in 2003, and was demolished. and David Lister School closed at the end of the 2012 academic year, having been scheduled for early closure and replacement under the Building Schools for the Future programme.

In 2016 a 162 home residential development was given planning permission for the former barrel works site.

See also
List of areas in Kingston upon Hull

Notes

References

Locations

Sources

Further reading

External links

Wards and districts of Kingston upon Hull
Geographic histories of Kingston upon Hull